Deh Pish-e Sofla (also Romanized as Deh Pīsh-e Soflá and Deh Pish Sofla; also known as Deh Pīsh, Deh Pīsh-e Pā’īn, Deh Pish Vosta, and Shahrak-e Deh Pīsh) is a village in Nakhlestan Rural District, in the Central District of Kahnuj County, Kerman Province, Iran. At the 2006 census, its population was 473, in 89 families.

References 

Populated places in Kahnuj County